Gavilan is an American adventure drama television series that aired on NBC from October 26, 1982 until March 18, 1983.

Plot
Robert Gavilan (Robert Urich) is a former CIA agent who now works for the Oceanographic Institute, which is headed by Marion Jaworski. Every now and then, someone from Gavilan's past as a CIA spy comes to him asking for his help. Or, on one of the jobs that Gavilan is on, the situation somehow turns into trouble, or someone he knows just needs his help as both as former spy, or as an oceanographer. Milo Bentley is an old friend of his father's, who stays in Robert's guest room, and uses his history with his father to freeload, and mooch off him.

Cast
 Robert Urich as Robert Gavilan
 Kate Reid as Marion Jaworski
 Patrick Macnee as Milo Bentley

US television ratings

Episodes

Production
The show was made by Tom Mankiewicz and Leonard Goldberg, who had enjoyed success with Hart to Hart. Fernando Lamas was originally cast as the conman. The lead character was named after the boxer Kid Gavilán (often spelled Kid Gavilan in US). NBC made an order for 13 episodes but the show was taken off the air after ten episodes had aired.  Episodes were rerun on TNT in 1994 alongside Chicago Story with Dennis Franz.

See also 
 1982–83 United States network television schedule

References

External links
 

1982 American television series debuts
1983 American television series endings
English-language television shows
Espionage television series
NBC original programming
Television series by MGM Television
Television shows set in Virginia